Hemibates stenosoma is a species of cichlid endemic to Lake Tanganyika in East Africa. This species was formerly regarded as the only formally described member of its genus., however, another species, Hemibates koningsi, which was formerly referred to as Hemibates sp. "stenosoma chituta" before its formal description.

References 

Bathybatini
Fish of Lake Tanganyika
Taxa named by George Albert Boulenger
Fish described in 1901